The People's State of Reuss was a short-lived state in what is now Thuringia. The state was formed on 4 April 1919 after the reigning princes of the two Reuss principalities abdicated and elections were held in both states. The People's State of Reuss had a non-contiguous area of 1,143 square kilometers, 211,324 inhabitants (1919) and was divided into three districts.

It united with six other small states to form Thuringia, a member state of the Weimar Republic, on 1 May 1920.

References

External links
 https://web.archive.org/web/20080217200153/http://home.att.net/~david.danner/militaria/reuss.htm
 Principalities of Reuss-Gera and Reuss-Greiz 1778-1919 (Reuss, Germany), also with flag source

Former states and territories of Thuringia
1919 establishments in Europe
1920 disestablishments in Europe
States of the Weimar Republic
People's